"Has Anyone Ever Written Anything for You?" is a song written by Stevie Nicks and Keith Olsen off the 1985 album Rock a Little. The song was also released as a single in 1986, peaking at No. 60 for two weeks on the Billboard Hot 100. 

During the VH1 Storytellers series, Nicks explained that "Has Anyone Ever Written Anything for You?" was written about the death of Joe Walsh's eldest daughter, Emma Kristen, and his subsequent penning of "Song for Emma" for the album So What.

Billboard called it a "low, throaty ballad with acoustic piano and reflective imagery."

"Has Anyone Ever Written Anything for You?" appears on the 1991 compilation album Timespace: The Best of Stevie Nicks.

Track listing

UK 7 inch Single – EMI 5574

UK 12 inch Single – 12 EMI 5574

Reception
Mike DeGagne of AllMusic retrospectively applauded Nicks for her "wholehearted approach" on "Has Anyone Ever Written Anything for You?".

References

Sources

External links

1986 singles
1985 songs
Stevie Nicks songs
Songs written by Stevie Nicks
Atlantic Records singles
Song recordings produced by Keith Olsen
Songs written by Keith Olsen
Commemoration songs
Modern Records (1980) singles